XHPNVO-FM is a radio station on 93.3 FM in El Salto, Durango, Mexico. It is owned by Grupo Promomedios and is known as La Nueva.

History
XHPNVO was awarded in the IFT-4 radio auction of 2017 and came to air on April 16, 2018. It is the first radio station in El Salto.

References

External links

Radio stations in Durango
Radio stations established in 2018
2018 establishments in Mexico